Kandipara Askar Ali High School is a secondary school in Gaffargaon Upazila, Mymensingh District, Bangladesh. The school was founded in 1906 by Askar Ali Sarkar.

Here also have JSC, SSC & HSC center.

References

High schools in Bangladesh
Schools in Mymensingh District
Educational institutions established in 1906
1906 establishments in India